The 2016–17 Slovak Extraliga season was the 24th season of the Slovak Extraliga, the highest level of ice hockey in Slovakia.

Teams
The following teams are participating in the 2016–17 season. The HK Orange 20 is a project for preparation of the Slovakia junior ice hockey team for the IIHF World U20 Championship. The team do not play complete regular season and cannot promote to the playoffs or get relegated. First 8 teams in table after the regular season (50 games) will promote to the playoffs.

Regular season

Rules for classification: 1) Points; 2) Head-to-head points.

Playoffs

Bracket

Relegation series (PlayOut)

Rules for classification: 1) Points; 2) Head-to-head points.

External links
Official website

Final rankings

Slovak Extraliga seasons
Slovak
2016–17 in Slovak ice hockey leagues